Tunstall is a suburb of Sunderland, Tyne and Wear, England which is mostly a privately purchased estate. It is located to the west of Ryhope, and east of Silksworth. The area was built around a large hill, known as Tunstall Hill. Since 1966 pilgrims have erected crucifixes on the hill every Good Friday.

It is the location of Venerable Bede Church of England Academy, which is on the former site of Ryhope Colliery and later Ryhope golf course.

History
Tunstall is a village that has been present since the early middle ages, first mentioned in the 1183 Norman era Boldon Book the contemporary village green continues to mirror its medieval shape. By the 14th century, Hatfield's survey of Durham recorded 12 tenants in the village who held 110 acres of block demesne lands, with 14 dwellings, a mill and two cottages on the land.

References

City of Sunderland suburbs
Sunderland